Dean Kramer (born April 29, 1952, Philadelphia) is an American pianist and a professor emeritus of piano at the University of Oregon.

Kramer studied music at the Oberlin Conservatory of Music (student of Joseph Schwartz) and the University of Texas (student of John Perry), and also performed in masterclasses in France for Leon Fleisher. He also studied with Gina Bachauer and performed for Arthur Rubinstein in Alice Tully Hall, New York. Kramer was one of the few pianists to have studied with Vladimir Horowitz. In 1972, Kramer was awarded first place at the Washington International Piano Competition, D.C. Three years later, in 1975, he won the first national Chopin competition in Miami, and then won fifth place in the IX International Chopin Piano Competition in Warsaw.

References 

1952 births
Living people
American classical pianists
Male classical pianists
American male pianists
Prize-winners of the International Chopin Piano Competition
Oberlin College alumni
University of Texas at Austin College of Fine Arts alumni
20th-century American pianists
20th-century American male musicians